In linear algebra, two matrices  and  are said to commute if , or equivalently if their commutator  is zero. A set of matrices  is said to commute if they commute pairwise, meaning that every pair of matrices in the set commute with each other.

Characterizations and properties 
 Commuting matrices preserve each other's eigenspaces. As a consequence, commuting matrices over an algebraically closed field are simultaneously triangularizable; that is, there are bases over which they are both upper triangular. In other words, if  commute, there exists a similarity matrix  such that  is upper triangular for all . The converse is not necessarily true, as the following counterexample shows:

 However, if the square of the commutator of two matrices is zero, that is, then the converse is true.
The converse is also true; that is, if two diagonalizable matrices commute, they are simultaneously diagonalizable. But if you take any two matrices that commute (and do not assume they are two diagonalizable matrices) they are simultaneously diagonalizable already if one of the matrices has no multiple eigenvalues.
 If  and  commute, they have a common eigenvector.
 If one of the matrices has the property that its minimal polynomial coincides with its characteristic polynomial (that is, it has the maximal degree), which happens in particular whenever the characteristic polynomial has only simple roots, then the other matrix can be written as a polynomial in the first.
This theorem is due to Frobenius.
 Two Hermitian matrices commute if their eigenspaces coincide. In particular, two Hermitian matrices without multiple eigenvalues commute if they share the same set of eigenvectors. This follows by considering the eigenvalue decompositions of both matrices. It then follows that
 
As an example, the identity matrix commutes with all matrices, which between them do not all commute. If the set of matrices considered is restricted to Hermitian matrices without multiple eigenvalues, then commutativity is transitive, as a consequence of the characterization in terms of eigenvectors.
 Lie's theorem, which shows that any representation of a solvable Lie algebra is simultaneously upper triangularizable may be viewed as a generalization.
In other words, the center of the group of n × n matrices under multiplication is the subgroup of scalar matrices.

Examples

 The identity matrix commutes with all matrices.
 Jordan blocks commute with upper triangular matrices that have the same value along bands.
 If the product of two symmetric matrices is symmetric, then they must commute. That also means that every diagonal matrix commutes with all other diagonal matrices.
 Circulant matrices commute. They form a commutative ring since the sum of two circulant matrices is circulant.

History 
The notion of commuting matrices was introduced by Cayley in his memoir on the theory of matrices, which also provided the first axiomatization of matrices. The first significant results proved on them was the above result of Frobenius in 1878.

References 

Matrix theory